Pinapaka is a Mandal in Bhadradri Kothagudem district, Telangana.

Assembly constituency
It is an Assembly constituency in Telangana Legislative Assembly. Pinapaka, Manuguru, Gundala, Burgampahad and Aswapuram mandals comes under this constituency.

Demographics

 Total Population: 	46,597	in 10,619 Households. 	
 Male Population: 	23,665	and Female Population: 	22,932		
 Children Under 6-years of age: 7,049	(Boys - 3,600 and Girls -3,449)
 Total Literates: 	20,046

Villages
The villages in Pinapaka mandal include:
 Anantharam
 Barlagudem 	
 Battupalli 	
 Bayyaram 	
 Duginepalli 	
 Elchireddipally 	
 Janampeta 	
 Karakagudem 	
 Mallaram
 Padma Puram 	
 Pinapaka 	
 Potlapalli 	
 Regalla 	
 Samath Mothe 	
 Samathbattupalli 	
 Singireddipalli 	
 Uppaka
 Venkatraopeta
 T.Kothagudem
 Bheemavaram

References

Mandals in Bhadradri Kothagudem district